Siham is a feminine given name that may refer to
Siham Alawami, Qatari  television journalist and producer
Siham Bayyumi (born 1949), Egyptian writer and journalist 
Siham Benchekroun, Moroccan novelist and poet 
Siham Hashi, member of the Canadian Pop/R&B musical duo Faarrow
Siham Hilali (born 1986), Moroccan middle-distance runner 
Siham Sergiwa, a Libyan psychologist elected to the Libyan parliament in 2014